Events from the year 1760 in Austria

Incumbents
 Monarch – Maria Theresa

Events

 August 30 – Seven Years' War – Battle of Legnica: Prussia under Frederick the Great defeat the Austrian army of Marshal Laudon before it can unite with that of Marshal Daun.
 November 3 – Seven Years' War – Battle of Torgau: The Prussian army defeats Daun's Austrians, who withdraw across the Elbe.

Births

Deaths

References

 
Years of the 18th century in Austria